The Lima Peru Temple is the 38th operating temple of the Church of Jesus Christ of Latter-day Saints (LDS Church).

History
Due to growth in Peru, church leaders announced in 1981 that a temple would be built in the city of Lima. Gordon B. Hinckley, then a counselor in the church's First Presidency, dedicated the Lima Peru temple on January 10, 1986.

The Lima Peru Temple serves more than four hundred thousand Latter-day Saints in the country.

On April 3, 2016, church president Thomas S. Monson announced the intent to construct a second temple in the city. This temple will be called the Lima Peru Los Olivos Temple. Upon completion of this second temple, Lima will be the third city (and first outside of Utah) to have more than one temple, following the Utah cities of South Jordan and Provo.

In 2020, the Lima Peru Temple was closed temporarily during the year in response to the coronavirus pandemic.

See also

 Dean L. Larsen, a former temple president
 Comparison of temples of The Church of Jesus Christ of Latter-day Saints
 List of temples of The Church of Jesus Christ of Latter-day Saints
 List of temples of The Church of Jesus Christ of Latter-day Saints by geographic region
 Temple architecture (Latter-day Saints)
 The Church of Jesus Christ of Latter-day Saints in Peru
 Pachacamac, ancient temple site southeast of Lima

References

External links
 Lima Peru Temple Official site
 Lima Peru Temple at ChurchofJesusChristTemples.org

20th-century Latter Day Saint temples
Buildings and structures in Lima
Religious buildings and structures completed in 1986
Temples (LDS Church) in Peru
1986 establishments in Peru